Lena Stolze (born 8 August 1956 in Berlin) is a German television and film actress.

Life and work
Lena Stolze's father is Gerhard Stolze, a tenor, and her mother is the actress Gabi Stolze. In 1961, the family moved from East Germany to Vienna.

Lena Stolze is best known for playing Sophie Scholl in Fünf letzte Tage and Die Weiße Rose (Both 1982), and for her role as Sonja (a fictionalized version of Anna Rosmus) in Das schreckliche Mädchen (1990).

She and Julia Jentsch both won the Film Award in Gold at the German Film Awards as "Best Actress" for portraying Sophie Scholl, in their separate portrayals, in Die Weiße Rose (1982) and Die Letzen Tage (2005), respectively.

Awards

1983 Bavarian Film Awards, Best Actress

Filmography
1978
Lemminge (TV film)
1982
Fünf letzte Tage (Last Five Days, film)
Die Weiße Rose (The White Rose, film)
1984
 (The Swing, film)
Morgen in Alabama (Man Under Suspicion, film)
1987
Maschenka (film)
1989
Das schreckliche Mädchen (The Nasty Girl, film)
1991
Struppi und Wolf (TV film)
1993
 (TV film)
Todesreigen (TV film)
1994
Die Vergebung (Forgiveness, TV film)
Nur der Sieg zählt (TV film)
1995
Brother of Sleep (film)
Diebinnen (Women Robbers, film)
The Public Prosecutor (TV series, 3 episodes)
: Dr. Vogt - Afrika vergessen (TV series episode)
1996
The Writing on the Wall - Operation Schmetterling GB/D (TV film)
Mein Herz - Niemanden! (My Heart Is Mine Alone, film)
1997
Winterkind (TV film)
Gefangene der Liebe (TV film)
1999
Relative Strangers - Verwandte Fremde GB/D (TV film)
2000
Brennendes Schweigen (TV film)
2001
Ein starkes Team: Der schöne Tod (TV series episode)
Stubbe: Unschuldsengel (TV series episode)
Späte Rache (TV film)
2002
Tatort: Schlaf, Kindlein, schlaf (TV series episode)
Die Cleveren: Herbstkinder (TV series episode)
Schlosshotel Orth: Verborgene Schätze (TV series episode)
 (film)
2003
Rosenstrasse (film)
Der Pfundskerl: Engel - Retter der Senioren (TV series episode)
2004
Delfinsommer (TV film)
Tatort: Bitteres Brot (TV series episode)
 (film)
Gun-Shy (film)
2005
Die Affäre Kaminski (TV film)
2006
Bis dass der Tod euch scheidet (TV film)
Tatort: Unter uns (TV series episode)
Tatort: Aus der Traum (TV series episode)
Doppelter Einsatz: Rumpelstilzchen (TV series episode)
Tatort: Das verlorene Kind (TV series episode)
Lapislazuli (film)
2007
And Along Come Tourists (film)
2013
Zurich (film)
2014
The Chosen Ones (TV film)

References

External links

Vogel Agency Berlin 

German television actresses
People from East Berlin
1956 births
Living people
Best Actress German Film Award winners
German film actresses
Actresses from Berlin
Actresses from Vienna
20th-century German actresses
21st-century German actresses